In geometry, the circumference (from Latin circumferens, meaning "carrying around") is the perimeter of a circle or ellipse. That is, the circumference would be the arc length of the circle, as if it were opened up and straightened out to a line segment. More generally, the perimeter is the curve length around any closed figure. 
Circumference may also refer to the circle itself, that is, the locus corresponding to the edge of a disk. 
The  is the circumference, or length, of any one of its great circles.

Circle 
The circumference of a circle is the distance around it, but if, as in many elementary treatments, distance is defined in terms of straight lines, this cannot be used as a definition. Under these circumstances, the circumference of a circle may be defined as the limit of the perimeters of inscribed regular polygons as the number of sides increases without bound. The term circumference is used when measuring physical objects, as well as when considering abstract geometric forms.

Relationship with  
The circumference of a circle is related to one of the most important mathematical constants. Pi is defined as the ratio of a circle's circumference  to its diameter 

Or, equivalently, as the ratio of the circumference to twice the radius. The above formula can be rearranged to solve for the circumference:

The use of the mathematical constant  is ubiquitous in mathematics, engineering, and science.

In Measurement of a Circle written circa 250 BCE, Archimedes showed that this ratio ( since he did not use the name ) was greater than 3 but less than 3 by calculating the perimeters of an inscribed and a circumscribed regular polygon of 96 sides. This method for approximating  was used for centuries, obtaining more accuracy by using polygons of larger and larger number of sides. The last such calculation was performed in 1630 by Christoph Grienberger who used polygons with 1040 sides.

Ellipse 

Circumference is used by some authors to denote the perimeter of an ellipse. There is no general formula for the circumference of an ellipse in terms of the semi-major and semi-minor axes of the ellipse that uses only elementary functions. However, there are approximate formulas in terms of these parameters. One such approximation, due to Euler (1773), for the canonical ellipse, 

is 

Here the upper bound  is the circumference of a circumscribed concentric circle passing through the endpoints of the ellipse's major axis, and the lower bound  is the perimeter of an inscribed rhombus with vertices at the endpoints of the major and minor axes.

The circumference of an ellipse can be expressed exactly in terms of the complete elliptic integral of the second kind. More precisely,

See also

References

External links 

 Numericana - Circumference of an ellipse

Geometric measurement
Circles